The Effects of 333 is the fifth studio album by Black Rebel Motorcycle Club. It was released on November 1, 2008 through the band's own Abstract Dragon imprint. The album is completely instrumental and was made available as a download through their official music store at 3:33 AM PT. It was first announced on October 27, 2008 via a MySpace bulletin, stating that the band would release their newest album independent of any record company. The cover art was drawn by Guitarist Peter Hayes.

Track listing

References

2008 albums
Black Rebel Motorcycle Club albums
Instrumental albums